Williams Lake, Halifax is a lake of the Halifax Regional Municipality, in Nova Scotia, Canada.

History 
Williams Lake was created in the late 18th century by settlers who collected rainwater to build a dam. In 1968, the Williams Lake Conservation Company was founded to preserve the lake. The current head of the company is Murray Coolican.

Geography 
Williams Lake is located at Cunard Junior High School. It is just outside the community of Spryfield and is approximately 7 km from Downtown Halifax.

See also
List of lakes in Nova Scotia

References
 National Resources Canada
 https://atlantic.ctvnews.ca/why-parts-of-a-popular-urban-lake-in-halifax-have-disappeared-1.5131176
Lakes of Nova Scotia